Suomi Island is an island off the coast of Western Australia. It is part of the Houtman Abrolhos and located at 28°43'00.0"S 113°50'00.0"E. "Suomi" means Finland (or Finnish) in the Finnish language, but any relation between Finland and the island is unknown.

References

Islands of the Houtman Abrolhos